Chaenactis nevii is a North American species of flowering plants in the aster family known by the common name John Day pincushion. It is found only in the John Day Basin area in the US State of Oregon.

Description
Chaenactis nevii is a perennial up to 30 cm (12 inches) tall. Each branch produces 1-3 flower heads each containing yellow disc florets but no ray florets.

The species is named for American missionary and botanist Reuben Denton Nevius (1827-1913).

References

External links
Paul Slichter, The Genus Chaenactis East of the Cascade Mts., John Day Chaenactis, John Day's Pincushion, Nevius's Chaenactis, Chaenactis nevii photos
United States Department of the Interior, National Park Service, State of the Park Report for John Day Fossil Beds National Monument, Resource Brief - Rare Plants

nevii
Flora of Oregon
Plants described in 1883
Flora without expected TNC conservation status

Asteraceae
Endemic flora of Oregon
Endemic flora of the United States